For the song of the same name written by Andy Prieboy, see Tomorrow Wendy (song)

	
Tomorrow Wendy: A Love Story is a teen novel by Shelley Stoehr published in 1998 and republished in 2003. Set on Long Island, it deals with a teenage girl's experiences with drugs and sexuality.

Tagline
"I've discovered that if you wear a big enough hat, no one worries much about what's going on inside your head."

Plot summary
Cary's head is such a mess, which is why she keeps it hidden under her floppy Audrey Hepburn hat. Her best friend Rad — whom only she can see — speaks to her in only song lyrics. Not even her boyfriend Danny knows what kind of things go through her head. He is especially oblivious to the fact that Cary has strong feelings for a girl named Wendy.

Wendy has bright green hair and "hard-candy sadness in her eyes". Cary thinks that this sexy and mysterious girl could love her just as much as her boyfriend Danny does. The only problem, is that Wendy happens to be Danny's twin sister.

External links
Review

1998 American novels
American LGBT novels
American young adult novels
Novels with lesbian themes
1990s LGBT novels
Lesbian teen fiction
Novels set in New York (state)
Long Island in fiction
LGBT-related young adult novels